The Welsh National Water Development Authority  (WNWDA) (Awdurdod Cenedlaethol Datblygu Dwr Cymru in Welsh) and later the Welsh Water Authority was one of ten regional water authorities set up in the UK and came into existence on 6 August 1973  with its headquarters in Brecon. by virtue of the Water Act 1973
It  took over the sewerage and sewage disposal responsibilities of the local authorities within its area, the roles and responsibilities of the six existing River Authorities in Wales and most of the water supply undertakings. The authority was dissolved in 1989 as part of the privatisation of the water industry.

Remit
It brought together  all the sewage disposal and sewerage functions from the following local authorities:
Anglesey County Council
Cardiff County Borough Council
Carmarthen Borough Council
Carmarthen Rural District Council
Ceiriog Rural District Council (within catchment area of the River Dee)
Cwmamman Urban District Council
Llandeilo Urban District Council
Llandeilo Rural District Council
Llandovery Borough Council
Maelor Rural District Council
Wrexham Rural District Council.

It took over the water supply functions previously held by local authorities in Wales which were:
Bwrdd Dŵr Eryri
Cardiganshire Water Board
Central Flintshire Water Board
Conway Valley Water Board
Gwent Water Board
Herefordshire Water Board
Llanelli and District Water Board
Loughor Joint Water Board
Merioneth Water Board
Mid-Glamorgan Water Board
Pembrokeshire Water Board
Radnorshire and North Breconshire Water Board
South-East Breconshire Water Board
Taf Fechan Water Board
West Denbighshire and West Flintshire Water Board
West Glamorgan Water Board
Private water companies such as Chester Water and Wrexham Water Company were excluded and continued in operation.

It also subsumed all the functions of the six river authorities in Wales – the Wye River Authority, the Usk River Authority, the Glamorgan River Authority, the South West Wales River Authority, the Gwynedd River Authority and the Dee and Clwyd River Authority. The boundary of WNWDA  was identical to that of the constituent river authorities and included parts of England in both the River Wye and River Dee catchments.

Organisation
At inception, WNWDA was organised in units that broadly reflected the originating business. Thus sewerage and sewage disposal was organised into a number of sewage divisions, water supply was similarly formed into a number of water divisions and river divisions exactly matching the roles and boundaries of the previous river authorities were created.

In 1984 a major re-structuring brought all the functions together in three multidisciplinary divisions, with a headquarters in Brecon. These were the South Eastern Division based in Nelson, South Western Division based in Haverfordwest, the Northern Division based in Bangor. There were sub-offices located in Hereford, Monmouth, Swansea, Lampeter, Caernarfon and Mold. At the time of this re-organisation the name of the authority changed to Welsh Water Authority.

Governance
The authority was governed by a board which included representatives from local authorities, central government and the major industries in Wales including agriculture. The chairman appointed by the government of the day was Lord Brecon but he was replaced by T. M. Haydn Rees in 1976 and then by John Elfed Jones in 1982.

Privatisation
In 1989 the water supply, sewerage, and sewage disposal functions of the authority were privatised to form Welsh Water with the regulatory and control functions passing to the newly created National Rivers Authority.

References

Water supply and sanitation in Wales
Defunct public bodies of the United Kingdom
Water management authorities in the United Kingdom